Hole is an EP by British post-rock band 65daysofstatic, released on 14 March 2005 on Monotreme Records. The title track is taken from their album The Fall of Math.

Track listing
"Hole" – 4:34
"Wrong Side of the Tracks" – 1:14
"The Fall of Math" (65dos Remix) – 4:06
"Betraying Chino" – 2:11
"No Station" – 2:11
"Retreat! Retreat!" (mothboy Remix) – 5:16
"4Connection" – 4:54

This EP also contains the video for "Retreat! Retreat!".

External links

65daysofstatic albums
2005 EPs